"Once More" is a 2001 single by The Orb with vocals by Aki Omori.  The B-sides include remixes by Mark Pritchard and Bedrock.  The Bedrock remix was featured on Sasha & Digweed's Communicate album. It peaked at #38 on the UK Singles Chart.

"Aki Omori used to sing with a band called Freaky Realistic," said Alex Paterson, "and we hooked up a few years ago. For once, we actually sat down round the kitchen table and started writing the song – which is unheard of for me. We used 'Higher Than The Sun', which we did years ago with Primal Scream, as a blueprint and actually finished it in November '98."

References

External links

The Orb songs
2001 singles
1998 songs
Island Records singles